Orobanche pubescens is a species of annual herb in the family Orobanchaceae. They have a self-supporting growth form. Individuals can grow to 0.17 m.

Sources

References 

pubescens